Tasosartan is an angiotensin II receptor antagonist.

It was withdrawn from FDA review by the manufacturer after phase III clinical trials showed elevated transaminases (a sign of possible liver toxicity) in a significant number of participants given the drug.

References

Tetrazoles
Pyridopyrimidines
Lactams
Angiotensin II receptor antagonists
Biphenyls